Tomás Baravalle (born 24 December 1990) is an Argentine-born rugby union player. Born at Rosario, he currently plays for American team Dallas Jackals in Major League Rugby (MLR). His usual position is as at Hooker. 

He played for Italian team Benetton in Pro14 and United Rugby Championship from 2018 to 2022.

After playing for Argentina Under 20 in 2010, from 2014 to 2015 Baravalle was named in the Argentina XV.

References

External links
It's rugby English Player Profile
Rugby pass profile
Player Profile

Expatriate rugby union players in Italy

1990 births
Living people
Sportspeople from Rosario, Santa Fe
Rugby union hookers
Argentine rugby union players
Jockey Club de Rosario players
Benetton Rugby players
Argentine expatriate sportspeople in Italy
Argentine expatriate rugby union players
Dallas Jackals players
Argentina international rugby union players